Washington's 49th legislative district is one of forty-nine districts in Washington state for representation in the state legislature. It covers central and west Vancouver.

The district's legislators are state senator Annette Cleveland and state representatives Sharon Wylie (position 1) and Monica Stonier (position 2), all Democrats.

See also
 Washington Redistricting Commission
 Washington State Legislature
 Washington State Senate
 Washington House of Representatives

References

External links
 Washington State Redistricting Commission
 Washington House of Representatives
 Map of Legislative Districts

49